Punk Goes Metal was the first compilation album to be released as part of the Punk Goes... series created by Fearless Records. It features covers of hard rock and heavy metal songs by punk rock bands and was released on August 1, 2000.

The Aquabats! contribution, "Why Rock?", is actually an original composition, credited to fictional band "Leather Pyrate".

Track listing

References

Covers albums
Punk Goes series
2000 compilation albums